The Ciudad Deportiva (Sports City) is a sports complex  in Nuevo Laredo, Mexico. It is home to the Tecolotes de Nuevo Laredo Mexican Baseball League team and the Toros de Nuevo Laredo Mexican professional basketball team from the Liga Nacional de Baloncesto Profesional. The Ciudad Deportiva's Estadio Nuevo Laredo (baseball park) can seat up to 12,000 fans at a baseball game and the Nuevo Laredo Multidisciplinary Gymnasium can seat 4,000 fans at a basketball game.

Phase II
Phase II of this project will include a new soccer stadium within Mexican Primera Division standards for a possible expansion of one of its teams to Nuevo Laredo. Part of Phase II has already been completed which includes an indoor stadium with a capacity of 4,000 fans that allows fans to enjoy basketball, volleyball, and gymnastics among other sports.

Gallery

References

See also
Estadio Nuevo Laredo
Tecolotes de Nuevo Laredo
Gimnasio Multidisciplinario Nuevo Laredo
Toros de Nuevo Laredo
Nuevo Laredo

2008 establishments in Mexico
Nuevo Laredo
Sports venues completed in 2008
Sports venues in Tamaulipas